Tsagan-Khak Lake is located in the Russian Republic of Kalmykia. It is the third-largest lake in the republic (19,9 km²).  Several industries are attached to the lake, including fishing, textiles, and plastics manufacturing. The lake is well known throughout southern Russia for its nude beaches.

Lakes of Kalmykia